Rollergirls is a 2006 A&E Network reality show examining the personalities, antics and motivations of the women involved with the Austin, Texas, Lonestar Rollergirls roller derby league. According to their website, the league was founded in 2001 and is run as a "skater-owned and operated" company.  Variety reported on March 13, 2006 that A&E was canceling the show due to low ratings.

The five league teams, of about ten members each, are the Cherry Bombs, Hellcats, Holy Rollers, Putas Del Fuego and Rhinestone Cowgirls. Episodes were initially broadcast on Monday nights beginning on January 2, 2006, with repeated showings throughout the week. Rollergirls was produced by Gary and Julie Auerbach, the creators of MTV's Laguna Beach: The Real Orange County.

Episodes

See also
 Roller derby
 Aggressive inline skating

References
 Rollergirls Variety.
  In 'Rollergirls,' drama queens take reality for a spin The Boston Globe, January 2, 2006.
 Reality sets in for new A&E series, Net ditches 'Rollergirls', Variety, March 13, 2006.

External links
 
 

2000s American reality television series
2006 American television series debuts
2006 American television series endings
A&E (TV network) original programming
Roller derby mass media
English-language television shows
Television shows set in Austin, Texas